Aluthepola Ganekanda Raja Maha Vihara (Also known as Aluthepola Vihara) is an old Buddhist temple in Minuwangoda, Sri Lanka. According to the regional folklore this temple is believed to be one of places where King Valagamba spent his time when five Dravidian were ruling Anuradhapura. The temple has been formally recognised by the Government as an archaeological site in Sri Lanka. The designation was declared on 22 November 2002 under the government Gazette number 1264.

References

External links
Aluthepola Ganekanda Raja Maha Viharaya

Buddhist temples in Gampaha District
Archaeological protected monuments in Gampaha District